Steamhammer, also known as Reflection, was the debut album by the British rock band Steamhammer, issued in March 1969. Steamhammer was American blues guitarist Freddy King's backing band whenever he toured England. The musicians in the band were Martin Quittenton (guitar), Kieran White (vocals, guitar, harmonica), Martin Pugh (guitar), Steve Davy (bass), and Michael Rushton (drums). The album includes classic blues numbers by B.B. King ("You'll Never Know") and Eddie Boyd ("Twenty-four Hours"), as well as compositions by band members White, Quittenton, and Pugh. The session musicians Harold McNair (flute) and Pete Sears (piano) also appear on the album.

The song "Junior's Wailing" was recorded by Status Quo on their album Ma Kelly's Greasy Spoon in 1970.

Track listing
Side 1
 "Water (Part One)" — (Martin Quittenton, Martin Pugh) 0:52
 "Junior's Wailing" — (Kieran White, Martin Pugh) 3:18
 "Lost You Too" — (Martin Quittenton, Kieran White) 3:28
 "She is the Fire" — (Martin Quittenton, Kieran White) 3:10
 "You'll Never Know" — (B.B. King) 3:27
 "Even the Clock" — (Martin Quittenton, Kieran White, Berkeley Graham) 3:49
Side 2
 "Down the Highway" — (Martin Quittenton, Kieran White) 4:28
 "On Your Road" — (Kieran White) 2:43
 "Twenty-Four Hours" — (Eddie Boyd) 7:28
 "When All Your Friends are Gone" — (Martin Quittenton, Kieran White) 3:49
 "Water (Part Two)" — (Martin Quittenton, Martin Pugh) 1:44

Release history
Steamhammer was released in 1969 (CBS 63611). "Junior's Wailing" was issued as a single.

Personnel

Band members
 Kieran White – vocals, harmonica
 Martin Pugh – lead guitar
 Martin Quittenton – rhythm guitar
 Steve Davy – bass guitar
 Michael Rushton – drums

Session musicians
 Harold McNair – flute
 Pete Sears – piano

Others
 Producer: Michael Vestey
 Executive Producer: Andrew Cameron Miller
 Recording Engineers: Michael Cooper and Henry Aubrey-Fletcher
 Co-ordination: Barry Taylor
 Photographs: Clive Barda
 Design: Bob Priest
 Clothes: Take Six
 Recorded in Pan Sound Studios (London) Ltd
 Devised and Produced by Artists Musical Productions Limited, 46 Curzon Street, London
 Published by Franklyn Boyd Music (except Twenty-four Hours)

References

External links
 Album information
 Steamhammer official website by Martin Pugh

Steamhammer (band) albums
1969 debut albums
CBS Records albums